Fireworks is the third studio album by the heavy metal band Angra. It was released in 1998 on Lucretia Records. It was their last album to feature Andre Matos on vocals and Luís Mariutti on bass, and the last to feature drummer Ricardo Confessori until Aqua in 2010.

Background 

According to guitarist Kiko Loureiro, vocalist Andre Matos had decided to leave Angra right after the Holy Live tour to work on his solo project Virgo (a collaboration with Sascha Paeth), and the band had started to rehearse with Edu Falaschi as his probable replacement. However, a French executive from the record company talked to them over dinner to help patch their differences. Even so, Kiko recalls feeling that Andre was distant, mostly working on his own compositions alone instead of collaborating with the other members.

Track listing

Personnel 
 Andre Matos - vocals, keyboards
 Kiko Loureiro - lead guitar
 Rafael Bittencourt - rhythm guitar
 Luis Mariutti - bass
 Ricardo Confessori - drums

Recording information 

Recorded at Metropolis and Rainmaker Studios, London, England, from April to June 1998.
Additional recordings at Marcus Studios, London, June 1998.
Orchestra recorded at Abbey Road Studios, London, May 1998.
Mixed by Chris Tsangarides at Rainmaker Studios, June 1998.
Mastered by Ian Cooper
Cover concept by Ricardo Confessori
Cover artwork & Sleeve design by Isabel de Amorium at Arsenic, Boulogne, France.

Charts

References 

1998 albums
Angra (band) albums
Albums produced by Chris Tsangarides